A work made for hire (work for hire or WFH), in copyright law in the United States, is a work that is subject to copyright and is created by employees as part of their job or some limited types of works for which all parties agree in writing to the WFH designation. Work for hire is a statutorily defined term and so a work for hire is not created merely because parties to an agreement state that the work is a work for hire. It is an exception to the general rule that the person who actually creates a work is the legally-recognized author of that work. In the United States and certain other copyright jurisdictions, if a work is "made for hire," the employer, not the employee, is considered the legal author. In some countries, this is known as corporate authorship. The entity serving as an employer may be a corporation or other legal entity, an organization, or an individual.

Author accreditation in the US 
Accreditation has no impact on work for hire in the US. The actual creator may or may not be publicly credited for the work, and this credit does not affect its legal status. States that are party to the Berne Convention for the Protection of Literary and Artistic Works recognize separately copyrights and moral rights, with moral rights including the right of the actual creators to publicly identify themselves as such, and to maintain the integrity of their work.

For example, Microsoft hired many programmers to develop the Windows operating system, which is credited simply to Microsoft Corporation.  By contrast, Adobe Systems lists many of the developers of Photoshop in its credits. In both cases, the software is the property of the employing company. In both cases, the actual creators have moral rights. Similarly, newspapers routinely credit news articles written by their staff, and publishers credit the writers and illustrators who produce comic books featuring characters such as Batman or Spider-Man, but the publishers hold copyrights to the work. However, articles published in academic journals, or work produced by freelancers for magazines, are not generally works created as a work for hire, which is why it is common for the publisher to require the copyright owner, the author, to sign a copyright transfer, a short legal document transferring specific author copyrights to the publisher. In this case the authors retain those copyrights in their work not granted to the publisher.

Law in the United States
The circumstances in which a work is considered a "work made for hire" is determined by the United States Copyright Act of 1976 as either

The first situation applies only when the work's creator is an employee, not an independent contractor. The determination of whether an individual is an employee for the purposes of the work made for hire doctrine is determined under the common law of agency, in which a court looks to a multitude of factors to determine whether an employer-employee relationship exists. In the Supreme Court case affirming that the common law of agency should be used to distinguish employees from independent contractors in the work for hire context, Community for Creative Non-Violence v. Reid,<ref>Cmty. for Creative Non-Violence v. Reid, 490 U.S. 730 (1989)</ref> the Court listed some of these factors: In determining whether a hired party is an employee under the general common law of agency, we consider the hiring party's right to control the manner and means by which the product is accomplished. Among the other factors relevant to this inquiry are the skill required; the source of the instrumentalities and tools; the location of the work; the duration of the relationship between the parties; whether the hiring party has the right to assign additional projects to the hired party; the extent of the hired party's discretion over when and how long to work; the method of payment; the hired party's role in hiring and paying assistants; whether the hiring party is in business; the provision of employee benefits; and the tax treatment of the hired party. See Restatement § 220(2) (setting forth a non-exhaustive list of factors relevant to determining whether a hired party is an employee).

On the other hand, if the work is created by an independent contractor or freelancer, the work may be considered a work for hire only if all of the following conditions are met:
 the work must come within one of the nine limited categories of works listed in the definition above, namely (1) a contribution to a collective work, (2) a part of a motion picture or other audiovisual work, (3) a translation, (4) a supplementary work, (5) a compilation, (6) an instructional text, (7) a test, (8) answer material for a test, (9) an atlas;
 the work must be specially ordered or commissioned;
 there must be a written agreement between the parties specifying that the work is a work made for hire by use of the phrase "work for hire" or "work made for hire."

In other words, mutual agreement that a work is a work for hire is not enough. Any agreement not meeting all of the above criteria is not a valid work for hire agreement and all rights to the work will remain with the creator. Further, courts have held that the agreement must be negotiated, though not signed, before the work begins. Retroactive contractual designation as a work for hire is not permitted.

When relying on agreements in which creators transfer rights to a hiring party (copyright transfer agreement), a hiring party often finds that it has only limited scope to alter, update, or transform the work. For example, a motion picture may hire dozens of creators of copyrightable works (e.g., music scores, scripts, sets, sound effects, costumes) any one of which would require repeated agreements with the creators if conditions for showing the film or creating derivatives of it changed. Failing to reach agreement with any one creator could prevent the showing of the film entirely. To avoid this scenario, producers of motion pictures and similar works require that all contributions by non-employees be works made for hire.

On the other hand, a work for hire agreement is less desirable for creators than a copyright transfer agreement. Under work for hire, the commissioning party owns all rights from the very start even if the contract is breached, whereas under a transfer of rights, the creator can hold back the rights until all terms of the contract are fulfilled. Holding back the rights can be a forceful tool when it is necessary to compel a commissioning party to fulfill its obligations.

An author has the inalienable right to terminate a copyright transfer 35 years after agreeing to permanently relinquish the copyright. However, according to the US Copyright Office, Circular 9 "the termination provisions of the law do not apply to works made for hire." These restrictions, in both the work for hire doctrine and the right of termination, exist out of recognition that artists frequently face unequal bargaining power in their business dealings. Nonetheless, failure to secure a work-for-hire agreement by commissioning organizations can create difficult situations. One such example is the artist Raymond Kaskey's 1985 statue Portlandia, an iconic symbol of the city of Portland, Oregon. Unlike most works of public art, Kaskey has put strong prohibitions on the use of images of the statue, located atop the main entrance to the famous Portland Building. He sued Paramount Pictures for including shots of the statue in the Madonna motion picture Body of Evidence. As a result, it is nearly impossible to film portions of one of downtown Portland's most vibrant neighborhoods, and the city has lost out on the potential to create merchandise and souvenirs from one of its most iconic landmarks.

An author can grant his or her copyright (if any) to the hiring party. However, if not a work made for hire, the author or the author's heirs may exercise their right to terminate the grant. Termination of a grant cannot be effective until 35 years after the execution of the grant or, if the grant covers the right of publication, no earlier than 40 years after the execution of the grant or 35 years after publication under the grant (whichever comes first).

The application of the law to materials such as lectures, textbooks, and academic articles produced by teachers is somewhat unclear. The near-universal practice in education has traditionally been to act on the assumption that they were not work for hire.

Where start-up technology companies are concerned, some courts have considered that the traditional factors for finding that an author is an "employee" can be less important than in more-established companies, for example if the employee works remotely and is not directly supervised, or if the employee is paid entirely in equity without benefits or tax withholding.

Work for hire amendment
In 1999, a work for hire related amendment was inserted into the Satellite Home Viewer Improvement Act of 1999.  It specified that sound recordings from musical artists could be categorized as works for hire from the recording studios.

Employer–employee relationship under agency law
If a work is created by an employee, part 1 of the copyright code's definition of a work made for hire applies. To help determine who is an employee, the Supreme Court inCCNV v. Reid'' identified certain factors that characterize an "employer-employee" relationship as defined by agency law:

 Control by the employer over the work (e.g., the employer may determine how the work is done, has the work done at the employer's location, and provides equipment or other means to create work)
 Control by employer over the employee (e.g., the employer controls the employee's schedule in creating work, has the right to have the employee perform other assignments, determines the method of payment, and/or has the right to hire the employee's assistants)
 Status and conduct of employer (e.g., the employer is in business to produce such works, provides the employee with benefits, and/or withholds tax from the employee's payment)

Copyright duration

United States
In the United States a "work for hire" (published after 1978) receives copyright protection until 120 years after creation or 95 years after publication, whichever comes first. This differs from the standard U.S. copyright term, life of the author plus 70 years, because the "author" of a work for hire is often not an actual person, in which case the standard term would be unlimited, which is unconstitutional. Works published prior to 1978 have no differentiation in copyright term between works made for hire and works with recognized individual creators.

European Union
In the European Union, even if a Member State provides for the possibility of a legal person to be the original rightholder, then the duration of protection is in general the same as the copyright term for a personal copyright: i.e., for a literary or artistic work, 70 years from the death of the human author, or in the case of works of joint authorship, 70 years from the death of the last surviving author.  If the natural author or authors are not identified, nor become known subsequently, then the copyright term is the same as that for an anonymous or pseudonymous work, i.e. 70 years from publication for a literary or artistic work; or, if the work has not been published in that time, 70 years from creation.  (Copyright durations for works created before 1993 may be subject to transitional arrangements.)

An exception is for scientific or critical editions of works in the public domain. Per article 70 of the German copyright law, editions as the result of scholarly or scientific analysis have a copyright length of 25 years. Therefore, the editor of an urtext score of an opera by Beethoven would only receive 25 years of protection,

See also
 Copyright Act of 1976 (U.S.)
 Copyright, Designs and Patents Act 1988 (CDPA; UK)
 Copyright law of the European Union
 Derivative work
 World Intellectual Property Organization (WIPO)

References

Further reading

External links
Copyright codes of various countries pertaining to Work For Hire:
 Ireland
 Copyright and Related Rights Act, 2000
 Sweden
 "Copyright" and "Trademark" in Sweden.
 United States
 "Circular 9: Works Made for Hire under the 1976 Copyright Act".  An information circular provided by the U.S. Government Copyright Office.
 "Works Made for Hire under the 1976 Copyright Act".  Works Made For Hire Complete.
 "Definitions" in USC section number 101 of Title 17 of U.S. Code.  Provides definitions of various kinds of "Work for hire"; "Derivative work" based on WFH; and many other definitions of pertinent terminology used in the U.S. Copyright Code.
 World
 "Copyright of Intellectual and Artistic Works" at WIPO. (Searchable site)
 UNESCO Collection of National Copyright Laws

Copyright law